One Step (Hangul: 원스텝; RR: Wonseuteb) is a 2017 South Korean musical drama film directed by Juhn Jai-hong and starring Sandara Park, Han Jae-suk, Cho Dong-in and Hong Ah-reum. Its production was inspired by the domestic Korean success of the American film, Begin Again.

Plot 
After being involved in a car accident, Si-hyun (Sandara Park) is left with no memories of the accident or her past. The accident causes her to see sounds in color which is often disorientating, forcing Si-hyun to protect her ears. She encounters Ji-won (Hong Ah-reum) in the hospital and moves in with her when she is later discharged. Upon hearing Si-hyun humming a strange melody in her sleep, Ji-won's brother, Woo-hyuk (Cho Dong-in), writes it down as a score and gives it to her, hoping that it would help her remember something of her former life. Meanwhile, Ji-il (Han Jae-suk), a failed songwriter stumbles upon this score and offers to find the melody. They embark on a healing journey as they collaborate to complete Si-hyun's melody.

Cast 
 Sandara Park as Si-hyun
 Kang Ye-seo as Young Si-hyun 
 Han Jae-suk as Ji-il 
 Cho Dong-in as Woo-hyuk 
 Hong Ah-reum as Ji-won
 Jo Dal-Hwan as Jung-hwan 
 Park Seo-young as Keyboardist in Woo-hyuk's band 
 Ha Hyun-gon as Woo-hyuk's band drum
 Bae Yong-geun as Record label CEO

Release 
In February 2017, it was revealed that the film was funded on a crowdfunding site.

It was released on May 10, 2017, in the Philippines and was distributed by Viva Films.

References

External links

2017 films
South Korean musical drama films
2010s musical drama films
2017 drama films
2010s South Korean films
2010s Korean-language films